Orthopterology is the scientific study of the order Orthoptera, which includes grasshoppers, crickets, locusts and some other insects. Someone that studies in this field is an orthopterist.

Orthopterology as a science

Orthopterological  societies
 Association for Applied Acridology International
 Orthopterists' Society
 German Society for Orthopterology

Orthopterological Journals
 Journal of Orthoptera Research

See also
 LUBILOSA

References

External links
Australian Plague Locust Commission
The Orthopterists' Society
AcridAfrica, les acridiens d'Afrique de l'Ouest

Subfields of entomology
Orthoptera